Gabriela Sabatini was the defending champion, but lost in semifinals to Steffi Graf.

Steffi Graf won the title by defeating Arantxa Sánchez Vicario 7–6(10–8), 6–1 in the final.

Seeds
The first eight seeds received a bye into the second round.

Draw

Finals

Top half

Section 1

Section 2

Bottom half

Section 3

Section 4

References

External links
 Official results archive (ITF)
 Official results archive (WTA)

Family Circle Cup
Charleston Open